Monica Hannan (born 1960) is the Managing Editor of NBC North Dakota News in Bismarck, North Dakota and anchors The Evening Report and First News at Five. She is also the host of North Dakota Today, a morning talk show.

Career
Monica Hannan started working at KFYR-TV when she was still in high school, but left to attend college. She returned in 1988 after working for several years at KMVT-TV in Twin Falls, Idaho. In the past, she has been the station's city beat reporter, the political reporter, a consumer reporter, and health reporter. She has been awarded three Emmy awards for her work. She also enjoys writing and has authored five books, two of them with her husband, Cliff Naylor. She wrote Gift of Death-A Message of Comfort and Hopehttps://www.amazon.com/Gift-Death-Message-Comfort-Hope/dp/0692745610/ref=sr_1_1?keywords=gift+of+death+hannan&qid=1582075822&sr=8-1 which tells stories of people's final days in a way that offers real hope for those who fear dying. She also wrote the 2006 book The Dream Maker which tells the story of Patrick Atkinson, founder of The GOD'S CHILD Project. The books she wrote with her husband are Dakota Day Trips : Discovering North Dakota's Hidden Treasures, and More Dakota Day Trips : Discovering North Dakota's Hidden Treasures.

Personal life
She is married to KFYR morning weathercaster and feature reporter Cliff Naylor and is the mother of three children. She has a bachelor's degree in history from Minnesota State University, Moorhead and a master's degree from the University of Mary. She is interested in North Dakota's past and has served as the president of the Bismarck Historical Society. She has also served on the board for North Dakota Catholic Charities.

Notes

External links
https://www.monicahannan.com/
Biography at KFYR-TV

People from Bismarck, North Dakota
Living people
1960 births
American women journalists
Place of birth missing (living people)
Journalists from North Dakota
21st-century American women